Marinella - 14 Apo ta oreotera tragoudia mou (Greek: Μαρινέλλα - 14 Από τα ωραιότερα τραγούδια μου) is a compilation of recordings by popular Greek singer Marinella, under the PolyGram Records - Philips series "14 Apo Ta Oreotera Tragoudia Mou" or "16 Apo Ta Oreotera Tragoudia Mou". This album is part of the compilation. It was released in 1987 in Greece and includes 14 recordings by Marinella from 1976 - 1985 for the PolyGram Records.

Track listing

References

1987 compilation albums
Greek-language compilation albums
Marinella compilation albums
Universal Music Greece compilation albums
PolyGram compilation albums